The United States has been involved in numerous foreign interventions throughout its history. By the broadest definition of military intervention, the US has engaged in nearly 400 military interventions between 1776 and 2019, with half of these operations occurring since 1950 and over 25% occurring in the post-Cold War period. The objectives for these interventions have revolved around economy, territory, social protection, regime change, protection of US citizens and diplomats, policy change, empire, and regime building.

There have been two dominant schools of thought in the United States about foreign policy—interventionism, which encourages military, diplomatic, and economic intervention in foreign countries—and isolationism, which discourages these.

The 19th century formed the roots of United States foreign interventionism, which at the time was largely driven by economic opportunities in the Pacific and Spanish-held Latin America along with the Monroe Doctrine, which saw the U.S. seek a policy to resist European colonialism in the Western hemisphere. The 20th century saw the U.S. intervene in two world wars in which American forces fought alongside their allies in international campaigns against Imperial Japan, Imperial and Nazi Germany, and their respective allies. The aftermath of World War II resulted in a foreign policy of containment aimed at preventing the spread of world communism. The ensuing Cold War resulted in the Truman, Eisenhower, Kennedy, Carter, and Reagan Doctrines, all of which saw the U.S. embrace espionage, regime change, proxy conflicts, and other clandestine activity internationally against the Soviet Union.

After the Soviet Union collapsed in 1991, the U.S. emerged as the world's sole superpower and, with this, continued interventions in Africa, Eastern Europe, and the Middle East. Following the September 11 attacks in 2001, the U.S. and its NATO allies launched the Global War on Terror in which the U.S. waged international counterterrorism campaigns against various extremist groups such as al-Qaeda and the Islamic State in various countries. The Bush Doctrine of preemptive war saw the U.S. invade Iraq in 2003 and saw the military expand its presence in Africa and Asia via a revamped policy of foreign internal defense. The Obama administration's 2012 "Pivot to East Asia" strategy sought to refocus U.S. geopolitical efforts from counter-insurgencies in the Middle East to increasing American involvement in East Asia, as part of a policy to contain an ascendant China.

The United States Navy has been involved in anti-piracy activity in foreign territory throughout its history, from the Barbary Wars to combating modern piracy off the coast of Somalia and other regions.

Post-colonial 

The 19th century saw the United States transition from an isolationist, post-colonial regional power to a Trans-Atlantic and Trans-Pacific power.

The first and second Barbary Wars of the early 19th century were the first nominal foreign wars waged by the United States following independence. Directed against the Barbary States of North Africa, the Barbary Wars were fought to end piracy against American-flagged ships in the Mediterranean Sea, similar to the Quasi-War with the French Republic.

The founding of Liberia was privately sponsored by American groups, primarily the American Colonization Society, but the country enjoyed the support and unofficial cooperation of the United States government.

Notable 19th century interventions included: 
 1811: United States federal agent Joel Roberts Poinsett arrives in Chile to assess the prospects of Chilean revolutionaries during their war against the Spanish Empire, leading the first of many U.S. interventions in Chile.
 1846 to 1848: During the Mexican–American War, Mexico and the United States warred over Texas, California, and what today is the American Southwest but was then part of Mexico. During this war, U.S. Armed Forces troops invaded and occupied parts of Mexico, including Veracruz and Mexico City.
 1854: Commodore Matthew Perry negotiated the Convention of Kanagawa, which effectively ended Japan's centuries of national isolation, opening the country to Western trade and diplomacy. The U.S. later advanced the Open Door Policy in 1899 that guaranteed equal economic access to China and support of Chinese territorial and administrative integrity.
 1871: The U.S. dispatched an expeditionary force to Korea after failed attempts to ascertain the fate of the armed merchant ship General Sherman, which was attacked during an unsuccessful attempt to open up trade with the isolationist kingdom in 1866. After being ambushed, the 650-man American expeditionary force launched a punitive campaign, capturing and occupying several Korean forts and killing over 200 Korean troops.

 1898: The short but decisive Spanish–American War saw overwhelming American victories at sea and on land against the Spanish Kingdom. The U.S. Army, relying significantly on volunteers and state militia units, invaded and occupied Spanish-controlled Cuba, subsequently granting it independence. The peace treaty saw Spain cede control over its colonies of Puerto Rico, Guam, and the Philippines to the United States. The U.S. Navy set up coaling stations there and in Hawaii. See also: Bath Iron Works
The early decades of the 20th century saw a number of interventions in Latin America by the U.S. government often justified under the Roosevelt Corollary to the Monroe Doctrine. President William Howard Taft viewed Dollar diplomacy as a way for American corporations to benefit while assisting in the national security goal of preventing European powers from filling any possible financial power vacuum.
 1898 to 1935: The United States launched multiple minor interventions into Latin America, resulting in U.S. military presence in Cuba, Honduras, Panama (via the Hay–Bunau-Varilla Treaty and Isthmian Canal Commission), Haiti (1915–1935), the Dominican Republic (1916–1924) and Nicaragua (1912–1925) & (1926–1933). The U.S. Marine Corps began to specialize in long-term military occupation of these countries, primarily to safeguard customs revenues which were the cause of local civil wars.
 1901: The Platt Amendment amended a treaty between the U.S. and the Republic of Cuba after the Spanish–American War, virtually making Cuba a U.S. protectorate. The amendment outlined conditions for the U.S. to intervene in Cuban affairs and permitted the United States to lease or buy lands for the purpose of the establishing naval bases, including Guantánamo Bay.

 1904: When European governments began to use force to pressure Latin American countries to repay their debts, Theodore Roosevelt announced his "Corollary" to the Monroe Doctrine, stating that the United States would not just prevent but militarily intervene in affairs between European and Latin American governments if European pressure resulted in the Latin countries becoming chronically unstable failed states.
 1906 to 1909: The U.S. governed Cuba under Governor Charles Magoon.
 1914: During a revolution in the Dominican Republic, the U.S. navy fired at revolutionaries who were bombarding Puerto Plata, in order to stop the action.
 1916 to 1924: U.S. Marines occupied the Dominican Republic following 28 revolutions in 50 years. The Marines ruled the nation completely except for lawless parts of the city of Santo Domingo, where warlords still held sway.
 1899 to 1901: The U.S. organized the China Relief Expedition during the Boxer Rebellion, which saw an eight-nation alliance put down a rebellion by the Boxer secret society and toppled the Qing dynasty's Imperial Army.
 1899 to 1913: The Philippine–American War saw Filipino revolutionaries revolt against American rule following the Spanish-American War. The U.S. Army deployed 100,000 (mostly National Guard) troops under General Elwell Otis to the Philippines, resulting in the poorly armed and poorly trained rebels to break off into armed bands. The insurgency collapsed in March 1901 when the leader, Emilio Aguinaldo, was captured by General Frederick Funston and his Macabebe allies. The concurrent Moro Rebellion resulted in the subsequent annexation of the Philippines by the United States.
 1910 to 1919: The Border War along the U.S.-Mexico border saw U.S. forces occupy Veracruz for six months in 1914. U.S. troops intervened in northern Mexico during the Pancho Villa Expedition.
 1917 to 1920: The U.S. intervened in Europe during World War I. Over the next 18 months, the U.S. would suffer casualties of 116,708 killed and 204,002 wounded. U.S. troops also intervened in the Russian Civil War against the Red Army via the Siberian intervention and the Polar Bear Expedition's North Russia intervention.

World War II 

A series of Neutrality Acts passed by the U.S. Congress in the 1930s sought to return foreign policy to non-interventionism in European affairs, as it had been prior to the American entry into World War I. However, Nazi German submarine attacks on American vessels in 1941 saw many provisions of the Neutrality Acts largely revoked. The Two-Ocean Navy Act of 1940 would ultimately increase the size of the United States Navy by 70%. The British-American destroyers-for-bases deal in September 1940 saw the U.S. transfer 50 Navy destroyers to the Royal Navy in exchange for rent-free, 99-year leases over various British imperial possessions. The U.S. gained the rights to establish new military bases in Antigua, British Guiana, Newfoundland, the Bahamas, the southern coast of Jamaica, the western coast of Saint Lucia, the Gulf of Paria, the Great Sound and Castle Harbour, Bermuda.

During the Second World War, the United States deployed troops to fight in Europe, North Africa, and the Pacific. The U.S. was a key participant in many battles, including the Battle of Midway, the Normandy landings, and the Battle of the Bulge. In the time period between December 7, 1941 to September 2, 1945, more than 400,000 Americans were killed in the conflict. After the war, American and Allied troops occupied both Germany and Japan. The U.S. maintains garrisoned military forces in both Germany and Japan today.

The United States also gave economic support to a large number of countries and movements who were opposed to the Axis powers. President Franklin D. Roosevelt's cash and carry policy was a precursor to what would become the Lend-Lease program, which "lent" a wide array of resources and weapons to many countries, especially Great Britain and the USSR, ostensibly to be repaid after the war. In practice, the United States frequently either did not push for repayment or "sold" the goods for a nominal price, such as 10% of their value. Significant aid was also sent to France and Taiwan, and resistance movements in countries occupied by the Axis.

Cold War 

Following the Second World War, the U.S. helped form the North Atlantic Treaty Organization in 1949 to resist communist expansion and supported resistance movements and dissidents in the communist regimes of Central and Eastern Europe and the Soviet Union during a period known as the Cold War. One example is the counterespionage operations following the discovery of the Farewell Dossier which some argue contributed to the fall of the Soviet regime. After Joseph Stalin instituted the Berlin Blockade, the United States, Britain, France, Canada, Australia, New Zealand and several other countries began the massive "Berlin airlift", supplying West Berlin with up to 4,700 tons of daily necessities. U.S. Air Force pilot Gail Halvorsen created "Operation Vittles", which supplied candy to German children. In May 1949, Stalin backed down and lifted the blockade. The U.S. spent billions to rebuild Europe and aid global development through programs such as the Marshall Plan.

In 1945, the United States and Soviet Union occupied Korea to disarm the Imperial Japanese Armed Forces that occupied the Korean peninsula. The U.S. and Soviet Union split the country at the 38th parallel and each installed a government, with the Soviet Union installing a Stalinist Kim Il-sung in North Korea and the US supporting anti-communist Syngman Rhee in South Korea, whom was elected president in 1948. Both leaders were authoritarian dictators. Tensions between the North and South erupted into full-scale war in 1950 when North Korean forces invaded the South. From 1950 to 1953, U.S. and United Nations forces fought communist Chinese and North Korean troops in the Korean War. The war resulted in 36,574 American deaths and 2–3 million Korean deaths. The war ended in a stalemate with the Korean peninsula devastated and every major city in ruins. North Korea was among the most heavily bombed countries in history. Fighting ended on 27 July 1953 when the Korean Armistice Agreement was signed. The agreement created the Korean Demilitarized Zone (DMZ) to separate North and South Korea, and allowed the return of prisoners. However, no peace treaty was ever signed, and the two Koreas are technically still at war. U.S. troops have remained in South Korea to deter further conflict.

Throughout the Cold War, the U.S. frequently used the Central Intelligence Agency (CIA) for covert and clandestine operations against governments and groups considered unfriendly to U.S. interests, especially in the Middle East, Latin America, and Africa. In 1949, during the Truman administration, a coup d'état overthrew an elected parliamentary government in Syria, which had delayed approving an oil pipeline requested by U.S. international business interests in that region. The exact role of the CIA in the coup is controversial, but it is clear that U.S. governmental officials, including at least one CIA officer, communicated with Husni al-Za'im, the coup's organizer, prior to the March 30 coup, and were at least aware that it was being planned. Six weeks later, on May 16, Za'im approved the pipeline.

In the early 1950s, the CIA spearheaded Project FF, a clandestine effort to pressure Egyptian king Farouk I into embracing pro-American political reforms. After he resisted, the project shifted towards deposing him, and Farouk was subsequently overthrown in a military coup in 1952. In 1953, under U.S. President Dwight Eisenhower, the CIA helped Shah Mohammad Reza Pahlavi of Iran remove the democratically elected Prime Minister, Mohammed Mossadegh. Supporters of U.S. policy claimed that Mossadegh had ended democracy through a rigged referendum.

In 1952, the CIA launched Operation PBFortune and, in 1954, Operation PBSuccess to depose the democratically elected Guatemalan President Jacobo Árbenz and ended the Guatemalan Revolution. The coup installed the military dictatorship of Carlos Castillo Armas, the first in a series of U.S.-backed dictators who ruled Guatemala. Guatemala subsequently plunged into a civil war that cost thousands of lives and ended all democratic expression for decades.

The CIA armed an indigenous insurgency in order to oppose the invasion and subsequent control of Tibet by China and sponsored a failed revolt against Indonesian President Sukarno in 1958. As part of the Eisenhower Doctrine, the U.S. also deployed troops to Lebanon in Operation Blue Bat. President Eisenhower also imposed embargoes on Cuba in 1958.

Covert operations continued under President John F. Kennedy and his successors. In 1961, the CIA attempted to depose Cuban president Fidel Castro through the Bay of Pigs Invasion, however the invasion was doomed to fail when President Kennedy withdrew overt U.S. air support at the last minute. During Operation Mongoose, the CIA aggressively pursued its efforts to overthrow Castro's regime by conducting various assassination attempts on Castro and facilitating U.S.-sponsored terrorist attacks in Cuba. American efforts to sabotage Cuba's national security played a significant role in the events leading up to the Cuban Missile Crisis, which saw the U.S. blockade the island during a confrontation with the Soviet Union. The CIA also considered assassinating Congolese leader Patrice Lumumba with poisoned toothpaste (although this plan was aborted).

In 1961, the CIA sponsored the assassination of Rafael Trujillo, former dictator of the Dominican Republic. After a period of instability, U.S. troops intervened the Dominican Republic into the Dominican Civil War (April 1965) to prevent a takeover by supporters of deposed left wing president Juan Bosch who were fighting supporters of General Elías Wessin y Wessin. The soldiers were also deployed to evacuate foreign citizens. The U.S. deployed 22,000 soldiers and suffered 44 dead. The OAS also deployed soldiers to the conflict through the Inter-American Peace Force. U.S. soldiers were gradually withdrawn from May onwards. The war officially ended on September 3, 1965. The first postwar elections were held on July 1, 1966, conservative Joaquín Balaguer defeated former president Juan Bosch.

At the end of the Eisenhower administration, a campaign was initiated to deny Cheddi Jagan power in an independent Guyana. This campaign was intensified and became something of an obsession of John F. Kennedy, because he feared a "second Cuba". By the time Kennedy took office, the United Kingdom was ready to decolonize British Guiana and did not fear Jagan's political leanings, yet chose to cooperate in the plot for the sake of good relations with the United States. The CIA cooperated with AFL–CIO, most notably in organizing an 80-day general strike in 1963, backing it up with a strike fund estimated to be over $1 million. The Kennedy Administration put pressure on Harold Macmillan's government to help in its effort, ultimately attaining a promise on July 18, 1963, that Macmillan's government would unseat Jagan. This was achieved through a plan developed by Duncan Sandys whereby Sandys, after feigning impartiality in a Guyanese dispute, would decide in favor of Forbes Burnham and Peter D'Aguiar, calling for new elections based on proportional representation before independence would be considered, under which Jagan's opposition would have better chances to win. The plan succeeded, and the Burnham-D'Aguiar coalition took power soon after winning the election on December 7, 1964. The Johnson administration later helped Burnham fix the fraudulent election of 1968—the first election after decolonization in 1966. To guarantee Burnham's victory, Johnson also approved a well-timed Food for Peace loan, announced some weeks before the election so as to influence the election but not to appear to be doing so. U.S.–Guyanese relations cooled in the Nixon administration. Henry Kissinger, in his memoirs, dismissed Guyana as being "invariably on the side of radicals in Third World forums."

From 1965 to 1973, U.S. troops fought at the request of the governments of South Vietnam, Laos, and Cambodia during the Vietnam War against the military of North Vietnam and against Viet Cong, Pathet Lao, and Khmer Rouge insurgents. President Lyndon Johnson escalated U.S. involvement following the Gulf of Tonkin Resolution. North Vietnam invaded Laos in 1959, and used 30,000 men to build invasion routes through Laos and Cambodia. North Vietnam sent 10,000 troops to attack the south in 1964, and this figure increased to 100,000 in 1965. By early 1965, 7,559 South Vietnamese hamlets had been destroyed by the Viet Cong. The CIA organized Hmong tribes to fight against the Pathet Lao, and used Air America to "drop 46 million pounds of foodstuffs....transport tens of thousands of troops, conduct a highly successful photoreconnaissance program, and engage in numerous clandestine missions using night-vision glasses and state-of-the-art electronic equipment." After sponsoring a coup against Ngô Đình Diệm, the CIA was asked "to coax a genuine South Vietnamese government into being" by managing development and running the Phoenix Program that killed thousands of insurgents. North Vietnamese forces attempted to overrun Cambodia in 1970, to which the U.S. and South Vietnam responded with a limited incursion. The U.S. bombing of Cambodia, called Operation Menu, proved controversial. Although David Chandler argued that the bombing "had the effect the Americans wanted--it broke the communist encirclement of Phnom Penh," others have claimed it boosted recruitment for the Khmer Rouge. North Vietnam violated the Paris Peace Accords after the US withdrew, and all of Indochina had fallen to communist governments by late 1975.

In 1975 it was revealed by the Church Committee that the United States had covertly intervened in Chile from as early as 1962, and that from 1963 to 1973, covert involvement was "extensive and continuous". In 1970, at the request of President Richard Nixon, the CIA planned a "constitutional coup" to prevent the election of Marxist leader Salvador Allende in Chile, while secretly encouraging Chilean Armed Forces generals to act against him. The CIA changed its approach after the murder of Chilean general René Schneider, offering aid to democratic protestors and other Chilean dissidents. Allende was accused of supporting armed groups, torturing detainees, conducting illegal arrests, and muzzling the press. However, Peter Kornbluh asserts that the CIA destabilized Chile and helped create the conditions for the 1973 Chilean coup d'état, which led to years of dictatorship under Augusto Pinochet.

From 1972 to 1975, the CIA armed Kurdish rebels fighting the Ba'athist government of Iraq. In 1973, Nixon authorized Operation Nickel Grass, an overt strategic airlift to deliver weapons and supplies to Israel during the Yom Kippur War, after the Soviet Union began sending arms to Syria and Egypt. The same year, Libyan leader Muammar Gaddafi claimed the Gulf of Sidra as sovereign territory and closed the bay, prompting the U.S. to conduct freedom of navigation operations in the area, as it saw Libya's claims as internationally illegitimate. The dispute resulted in Libyan-U.S. confrontations, including an incident in 1981 in which two U.S. F-14 Tomcats shot down two Libyan Su-22 Fitters over the gulf. In response to purported Libyan involvement in international terrorism, specifically the 1985 Rome and Vienna airport attacks, the Reagan administration launched Operation Attain Document in early 1986, which saw operations in March 1986 that killed 72 Libyans and destroyed multiple boats and SAM sites. In April 1986, the U.S. bombed Libya again, killing over 40 Libyan soldiers and up to 30 civilians. The U.S. shot down two Libyan Air Force MiG-23 fighters 40 miles (64 km) north of Tobruk in 1989.

Months after the Saur Revolution brought a communist regime to power in Afghanistan, the U.S. began offering limited financial aid to Afghan dissidents through Pakistan's Inter-Services Intelligence, although the Carter administration rejected Pakistani requests to provide arms. After the Iranian Revolution, the United States sought rapprochement with the Afghan government—a prospect that the USSR found unacceptable due to the weakening Soviet leverage over the regime. The Soviets invaded Afghanistan on December 24, 1979, to depose Hafizullah Amin, and subsequently installed a puppet regime. Disgusted by the collapse of detente, President Jimmy Carter began covertly arming Afghan mujahideen in a program called Operation Cyclone.

This program was greatly expanded under President Ronald Reagan as part of the Reagan Doctrine. As part of this doctrine, the CIA also supported the UNITA movement in Angola, the Solidarity movement in Poland, the Contra revolt in Nicaragua, and the Khmer People's National Liberation Front in Cambodia. U.S. and UN forces later supervised free elections in Cambodia. Under Reagan, the US sent troops to Lebanon during the Lebanese Civil War as part of a peace-keeping mission. The U.S. withdrew after 241 servicemen were killed in the Beirut barracks bombing. In Operation Earnest Will, U.S. warships escorted reflagged Kuwaiti oil tankers to protect them from Iranian attacks during the Iran–Iraq War. The United States Navy launched Operation Praying Mantis in retaliation for the Iranian mining of the Persian Gulf during the war and the subsequent damage to an American warship. The attack helped pressure Iran to agree to a ceasefire with Iraq later that summer, ending the eight-year war. Under Carter and Reagan, the CIA repeatedly intervened to prevent right-wing coups in El Salvador and the U.S. frequently threatened aid suspensions to curtail government atrocities in the Salvadoran Civil War. As a result, the death squads made plans to kill the U.S. Ambassador. In 1983, after an internal power struggle ended with the deposition and murder of revolutionary Prime Minister Maurice Bishop, the U.S. invaded Grenada in Operation Urgent Fury and held free elections. President George H. W. Bush ordered the invasion of Panama (Operation Just Cause) in 1989 and deposed dictator Manuel Noriega.

Post-Cold War 

In 1990 and 1991, the U.S. intervened in Kuwait after a series of failed diplomatic negotiations, and led a coalition to repel invading Iraqi forces led by Iraqi dictator Saddam Hussein, in what became known as the Gulf War. On February 26, 1991, the coalition succeeded in driving out the Iraqi forces. The U.S., UK, and France responded to popular Shia and Kurdish demands for no-fly zones, and intervened and created no-fly zones in Iraq's south and north to protect the Shia and Kurdish populations from Saddam's regime. The no-fly zones cut off Saddam from the country's Kurdish north, effectively granting autonomy to the Kurds, and would stay active for 12 years until the 2003 invasion of Iraq.

In the 1990s, the U.S. intervened in Somalia as part of UNOSOM I and UNOSOM II, a United Nations humanitarian relief operation that resulted in saving hundreds of thousands of lives. During the 1993 Battle of Mogadishu, two U.S. helicopters were shot down by rocket-propelled grenade attacks to their tail rotors, trapping soldiers behind enemy lines. This resulted in a brief but bitter street firefight; 18 Americans and more than 300 Somalis were killed.

Under President Bill Clinton, the U.S. participated in Operation Uphold Democracy, a UN mission to reinstate the elected president of Haiti, Jean-Bertrand Aristide, after a military coup. In 1995, Clinton ordered U.S. and NATO aircraft to attack Bosnian Serb targets to halt attacks on UN safe zones and to pressure them into a peace accord. Clinton deployed U.S. peacekeepers to Bosnia in late 1995, to uphold the subsequent Dayton Agreement.

The CIA was involved in the failed 1996 coup attempt against Saddam Hussein.

In response to the 1998 al-Qaeda bombings of U.S. embassies in East Africa that killed a dozen Americans and hundreds of Africans, President Clinton ordered Operation Infinite Reach on August 20, 1998, in which the U.S. Navy launched cruise missiles at al-Qaeda training camps in Afghanistan and a pharmaceutical factory in Sudan believed to be producing chemical weapons for the terror group. It was the first publicly acknowledged preemptive strike against a violent non-state actor conducted by the U.S. military.

Also, to stop the ethnic cleansing and genocide of Albanians by nationalist Serbians in the former Federal Republic of Yugoslavia's province of Kosovo, Clinton authorized the use of U.S. Armed Forces in a NATO bombing campaign against Yugoslavia in 1999, named Operation Allied Force.

A 2016 study by Carnegie Mellon University professor Dov Levin found that the United States intervened in 81 foreign elections between 1946 and 2000, with the majority of those being through covert, rather than overt, actions.<ref>The U.S. is no stranger to interfering in the elections of other countries, Los Angeles Times, (December 21, 2016).</ref> A 2021 review of the existing literature found that foreign interventions since World War II tend overwhelmingly to fail to achieve their purported objectives.

 War on terror 

After the September 11, 2001 attacks, under President George W. Bush, the U.S. and NATO launched the global War on Terror, which began in earnest with an intervention to depose the Taliban government in the Afghan War, which the U.S. suspected of protecting al-Qaeda. In December 2009, President Barack Obama ordered a "surge" in U.S. forces to Afghanistan, deploying an additional 30,000 troops to fight al-Qaeda and the Taliban insurgency, before ordering a drawdown in 2011. Afghanistan continued to host U.S. and NATO counter-terror and counterinsurgency operations (ISAF/Resolute Support and operations Enduring Freedom/Freedom's Sentinel) until 2021, when the Taliban retook control of Afghanistan amidst the negotiated American-led withdrawal from the country. Over 2,400 Americans, 18 CIA operatives, and over 1,800 civilian contractors, died in the Afghan War. The war in Afghanistan became the longest war in United States history, lasting 19 years and ten months–the Vietnam War lasted 19 years and five months–and cost the U.S. over $2 trillion.

Though "Operation Enduring Freedom" (OEF) usually refers to the 2001–2014 phase of the war in Afghanistan, the term is also the U.S. military's official name for the War on Terror, and has multiple subordinate operations which see American military forces deployed in regions across the world in the name of combating terrorism, often in collaboration with the host nation's central government via security cooperation and status of forces agreements:
 Operation Enduring Freedom – Horn of Africa (OEF-HOA): U.S. forces deployed in Ethiopia, Kenya, Liberia, Mauritius, Rwanda, Seychelles, Somalia, Tanzania, and Uganda.
Camp Lemonnier is the only permanent U.S. military base in Africa, established in Djibouti in 2002, and supports OEF-HOA operations.
The Peace Corps re-established a presence in Comoros in 2015, and Kentucky National Guard personnel have trained Comoros troops.
The Trump administration increased drone strikes in Somalia and in 2020 launched Operation Octave Quartz, which saw U.S. troops dispersed from the nation and re-positioned to other military bases in the region.
 Operation Enduring Freedom – Trans Sahara (OEF-TS): U.S. forces deployed in Algeria, Burkina Faso, Cameroon, Chad, Mali, Mauritania, Morocco, Niger, Nigeria, Senegal, and Tunisia.
In 2013, the U.S. began providing transport aircraft to the French Armed Forces during the Mali War.
President Barack Obama deployed up to 300 U.S. troops to Cameroon in October 2015 to conduct intelligence, surveillance and reconnaissance operations against the Boko Haram terrorist group. Contingency Location Garoua, a U.S. Army outpost housing around 200 troops and contractors in Garoua, was established by 2017.
Four U.S. special operations soldiers and five Nigeriens were killed during an Islamic State ambush in Niger in October 2017. There were around 800 U.S. military personnel in Niger at the time, most of whom were working on constructing a secondary drone base for U.S. and French aircraft in Agadez.
 Operation Enduring Freedom – Philippines
 Operation Enduring Freedom – Caribbean and Central America (OEF-CCA)
 Operation Enduring Freedom – Kyrgyzstan
 Operation Enduring Freedom – Pankisi Gorge

The War on Terror saw the U.S. military and intelligence community evolve its asymmetric warfare capabilities, seeing the extensive usage of drone strikes and special operations in various foreign countries including Afghanistan, Pakistan, Yemen, and Somalia against suspected terrorist groups and their leadership.

In 2003, the U.S. and a multi-national coalition invaded and occupied Iraq to depose President Saddam Hussein, whom the Bush administration accused of having links to al-Qaeda and possessing weapons of mass destruction (WMDs) during the Iraq disarmament crisis. No stockpiles of WMDs were discovered besides about 500 degraded and abandoned chemical munitions leftover from the Iran–Iraq War of the 1980s, which the Iraq Survey Group deemed not militarily significant. The U.S. Senate Select Committee on Intelligence found no substantial evidence of links between Iraq and al-Qaeda and President Bush later admitted that "much of the intelligence turned out to be wrong". Over 4,400 Americans and hundreds of thousands of Iraqi civilians died during the Iraq War, which officially ended on December 18, 2011.

In the late 2000s, the United States Naval Forces Europe-Africa launched the Africa Partnership Station to train coastal African nations in maritime security, including enforcing laws in their territorial waters and exclusive economic zones and combating piracy, smuggling, and illegal fishing.

By 2009, the U.S. had used large amounts of aid and provided counterinsurgency training to enhance stability and reduce violence in President Álvaro Uribe's war-ravaged Colombia, in what has been called "the most successful nation-building exercise by the United States in this century".

The 2011 Arab Spring resulted in uprisings, revolutions, and civil wars across the Arab world, including Libya, Syria, and Yemen. In 2011, the U.S. intervened in the First Libyan Civil War by providing air support to rebel forces. There was also speculation in The Washington Post'' that President Barack Obama issued a covert action, discovering in March 2011 that Obama authorized the CIA to carry out a clandestine effort to provide arms and support to the Libyan opposition. Libyan leader Muammar Gaddafi was ultimately overthrown and killed. American activities in Libya resulted in the 2012 Benghazi attack.

Beginning around 2012, under the aegis of operation Timber Sycamore and other clandestine activities, CIA operatives and U.S. special operations troops trained and armed nearly 10,000 Syrian rebel fighters against Syrian president Bashar al-Assad at a cost of $1 billion a year until it was phased out in 2017 by the Trump administration.

2013–2014 saw the rise of the Islamic State of Iraq and the Levant (ISIL/ISIS) terror organization in the Middle East. In June 2014, during Operation Inherent Resolve, the U.S. re-intervened into Iraq and began airstrikes against ISIL there in response to prior gains by the terrorist group that threatened U.S. assets and Iraqi government forces. This was followed by more airstrikes on ISIL in Syria in September 2014, where the U.S.-led coalition targeted ISIL positions throughout the war-ravaged nation. Initial airstrikes involved fighters, bombers, and cruise missiles. The coalition maintains a notable ground-presence in Syria today. The U.S. officially re-intervened in Libya in 2015 as part of Inherent Resolve.

In response to the 2014 Russian annexation of Crimea, the Obama administration established the European Deterrence Initiative (EDI), a program dedicated to bolstering American military presence in Central and Eastern Europe. The EDI has funded Operation Atlantic Resolve, a collective defense effort to enhance NATO's military planning and defense capabilities by maintaining a persistent rotation of American military air, ground and naval presence in the region to deter perceived Russian aggression along NATO's eastern flank. The Enhanced Forward Presence (EFP) force was established by NATO.

In March 2015, President Obama declared that he had authorized U.S. forces to provide logistical and intelligence support to the Saudis in their military intervention in Yemen, establishing a "Joint Planning Cell" with Saudi Arabia. American and British forces participated in the blockade of Yemen.

President Donald Trump was the first U.S. president in decades to not commit the military to new foreign campaigns, instead continuing wars and interventions he inherited from his predecessors, including interventions in Iraq, Syria and Somalia. The Trump administration often used economic pressure against international adversaries such as Venezuela and the Islamic Republic of Iran. In 2019, tensions between the U.S. and Iran triggered a crisis in the Persian Gulf which saw the U.S. bolster its military presence in the region, the creation of the International Maritime Security Construct to combat attacks on commercial shipping, and the assassination of prominent Iranian general Qasem Soleimani.

In March 2021, the Biden administration designated al-Shabaab in Mozambique as a terrorist organization and, at the request of the Mozambique government, intervened in the Cabo Delgado conflict. Army Special Forces were deployed in the country to train Mozambican marines.

See also

 American imperialism
 American exceptionalism
 Territorial evolution of the United States
 United States and state terrorism
 Criticism of United States foreign policy
 List of United States drone bases
 List of armed conflicts involving the United States
 List of the lengths of United States participation in wars
 Military history of the United States
 Historic regions of the United States
 Neoconservatism
 Manifest Destiny
 Foreign interventions by the Soviet Union
 Foreign interventions by China
 Foreign interventions by Cuba
 Foreign electoral intervention
 New Imperialism

References

History of the foreign relations of the United States
History of United States expansionism
United States